

Jardines or Jardine's may refer to:

Places
 Jardines (Tren Urbano station), San Juan, Puerto Rico
 Jardines del Rey, an archipelago off the north coast of Cuba
 Jardines de la Reina, an archipelago off the south coast of Cuba
 Jardine's Lookout, a mountain and a residential area in Hong Kong
 Jardine's Bazaar, a road located in Causeway Bay, Hong Kong

People
 Eliot A. Jardines, the first U.S. Assistant Deputy Director of National Intelligence for Open Source

Other uses
 Jardine Matheson, or simply Jardines, a multinational Fortune Global 500 corporation based in Hong Kong
 Florida v. Jardines, a U.S. Supreme Court case about warrantless police "drug-dog sniff" at the front door of a residence
 Jardine SA, an association football club in Hong Kong
 Jardine's parrot, more commonly known as the red-fronted parrot

See also
 Jardine (disambiguation)
 Jardin (disambiguation)